John J. Sweeney  was a catcher and outfielder in Major League Baseball for the 1883 Baltimore Orioles of the American Association, the 1884 Baltimore Monumentals of the Union Association and the 1885 St. Louis Maroons of the National League.

Sources

1858 births
Baseball players from New York City
19th-century baseball players
Major League Baseball catchers
Major League Baseball outfielders
Baltimore Orioles (AA) players
Baltimore Monumentals players
St. Louis Maroons players
Year of death missing
Brooklyn Atlantics (minor league) players
New York Metropolitans (minor league) players
New York New Yorks players
New York Quicksteps players
Camden Merritts players
Haverhill (minor league baseball) players
Manchester Maroons players
London Tecumsehs (baseball) players